PPTT may refer to:
Trentino Tyrolean People's Party
Parts per ten thousand
Poste Italiane